Kijewko is a part of the Szczecin City, Poland. It is on the right bank of Oder river, east of the Szczecin Old Town, and south of Szczecin-Dąbie.

Neighbourhoods of Szczecin